Avataran is an upcoming Assamese-language science fiction film directed and produced by Tarunabh Dutta under the banner of TD Film Studio Productions. The film features Reema Kaif, Ananya Parashar, Devyam Seal, Govind Malakar, Rimpi Das, Saurabh Hazarika, Pranjal Saikia, Purnima Saikia and Sameer Ranjane. The film was initially scheduled for a release on August 21, 2020, but the release date has been postponed due to the COVID-19 pandemic in India.

Production
Production and principal photography began in 2012. Filming took place in and around Guwahati, Assam.

References

External links
 
 Studio website
 
 
 Asam Bani - অসম বাণী - Asamese Weekly News Paper

Indian epic films
Assamese-language films
Upcoming Indian films
Films set in Assam
Indian science fiction films
Indian post-apocalyptic films
Upcoming films